The 1906 Grand National was the 68th renewal of the Grand National horse race that took place at Aintree near Liverpool, England, on 30 March 1906.

Finishing Order

Non-finishers

References

 1906
Grand National
Grand National
20th century in Lancashire
March 1906 sports events